Langenes Church is a parish church of the Church of Norway in Øksnes Municipality in Nordland county, Norway. It is located in the village of Stø, on the northern tip of the island of Langøya. It is one of the churches for the Øksnes parish which is part of the Vesterålen prosti (deanery) in the Diocese of Sør-Hålogaland. The white, wooden church was built in a cruciform style in 1795. The church seats about 165 people.

History
The earliest existing historical records of the church date back to 1589, but the church was not new at that time. In the 1770s, the church was described as a log building in a cruciform design. There was a choir in the east with a sacristy attached to it. In 1794–1795, the church underwent a massive renovation. The deconstructed a lot of the building and then rebuilt the church, reusing as much of the old materials as possible. The church was renovated in 1882 and again in 1929. Based on the building's history, it is not unlikely that parts of the present church consist of materials from the late Middle Ages.

Media gallery

See also
List of churches in Sør-Hålogaland

References

Øksnes
Churches in Nordland
Cruciform churches in Norway
Wooden churches in Norway
18th-century Church of Norway church buildings
Churches completed in 1795
16th-century establishments in Norway